Hahnia is the scientific name of two genera of animals and may refer to:

Hahnia (spider), a genus of spiders in the family Hahniidae
Hahnia (therapsid), a genus of prehistoric therapsids